Joseph Simon Volmar (26 October 1796 – 6 October 1865) was a Swiss painter and sculptor.

References
This article was initially translated from the German Wikipedia.

External links

19th-century Swiss painters
Swiss male painters
Swiss sculptors
1796 births
1865 deaths
19th-century sculptors
19th-century Swiss male artists